State of War may refer to:
State of War (video game), a 2001 real-time strategy game
State of War (novel), a novel by Ninotchka Rosca
State of War: The Secret History of the CIA and the Bush Administration, a documentary review by James Risen

See also 
Declaration of war, a formal act by which one nation declares that a state of war between it and another nation is at hand
Perpetual war, a war with no clear ending conditions
War, conflict between states, nations, or other parties